The Lithuanian Native pig is a landrace of the domestic pig (Sus scrofa domesticus) native to Lithuania.  This breed (in the broad sense) can be traced back to ancient times, and is one of the oldest pig varieties in Europe. It is a middle-sized breed.

The Lithuanian Native pig's typical features include wattles on the neck, and usually large black spots on the body, but colour variations include black-and-white, ginger, black, and tri-coloured. They have a friendly temperament. Being insensitive to sun, these pigs are suitable for grazing.

The Lithuanian Native's characteristics were used in producing the Lithuanian White, a standardized breed, and many Russian breeds. Now Lithuanian Native pigs are very rare even in Lithuania and in danger of extinction extinct. However, since 1993 a group of about 200 animals are preserved in the Institute of Animal Sciences

References

External links
 Lithuanian Native, Flickr photo
 Lithuanian Native, zum.lt photo
 Lithuanian Native, pinigukarta.lt photo

Pig breeds
Pig breeds originating in Lithuania
Pig landraces